Perunchithiranar may refer to:

 Perunchithiranar (Sangam poet), Tamil poet of the Sangam period
 Perunchithiranar (Tamil nationalist) (1933–1995), poet and Tamil nationalist